Hettinger County is a county in the U.S. state of North Dakota. As of the 2020 census, the population was 2,489. Its county seat is Mott.

The city of Hettinger, North Dakota, is in nearby Adams County.

History
The Dakota Territory legislature created the county on March 9, 1883, with territory partitioned from Stark County. Its government was not organized at that time. The county name was chosen by territorial legislator Erastus A. Williams, to honor his father-in-law, Mathias K. Hettinger (1810-1890), who had been a banker and public figure in Freeport, Illinois. A settlement on the Cannonball River was selected as the county seat (Mott).

The county boundaries were reduced in 1885 and 1887. The county was dissolved on November 3, 1896, but was re-created on May 24, 1901, by an action of the state supreme court. This re-creation slightly altered the county's boundaries, due to the redefinition of its boundary lines: a sliver of non-county area between 46°N latitude and the south boundary line of North Dakota was added; a sliver on the west boundary was lost when the definition of the line shifted from 103°W longitude to the survey line dividing Ranges 98 and 99 (to allow the county lines to be defined by federally-surveyed lines).

Since the county's government was still unorganized, it was attached to Stark County for administrative and judicial purposes on March 10, 1903.

On April 17, 1907, the southern half of the county was partitioned off to form Adams County. On April 19 the Hettinger County governmental organization was effected and the county was administratively detached from Stark County.

Efforts to dissolve Hettinger County
In 1891, the North Dakota Legislature approved legislation to dissolve Hettinger County and add its territory to Stark County, but the law was vetoed by Governor Eli C. D. Shortridge.

Annexation was attempted a second time in 1895, when the legislature passed legislation expanding the boundaries of Stark, Billings and Mercer Counties, subject to approval by the counties' voters. The vote was approved, annexation went into effect November 3, 1896, and Hettinger County was eliminated. However, Wilson L. Richards, a cattle rancher in one of the annexed counties, sued to overturn the annexation because he and other landowners were now subject to taxation by Stark County. The case went to the North Dakota Supreme Court, which ruled the law unconstitutional on May 18, 1899. The annexation remained in effect, however, due to a replacement law approved by the legislature March 9, 1899 in anticipation of the court's decision. The second annexation law was overturned by the Supreme Court in 1901 because the annexation was not referred to the voters of the affected counties as required by the North Dakota Constitution.

The Legislature passed a third annexation law in 1903, this time submitting it to the voters in Stark County and the unorganized counties of Dunn and Hettinger for approval. The annexation was approved by 502 votes in Stark County and 65 votes in Hettinger County, but it failed by 1 vote in Dunn County. Stark County claimed the annexation vote valid, since the legislation required a majority of the aggregate votes cast. However, the North Dakota Constitution required a majority vote in each affected county subject to annexation, so the state of North Dakota sued Stark County on the grounds that the enabling legislation was unconstitutional and that the "no" vote in Dunn County meant the annexation failed. The North Dakota Supreme Court ruled the 1903 law unconstitutional in 1905, which ended further attempts at annexation.

Geography
The Cannonball River flows east-southeasterly through the central part of the county. The county terrain consists of semi-arid rolling hills, mostly devoted to agriculture. The terrain slopes to the east and south; its highest point is a hill at the northwestern corner, at 2,897' (883m) ASL.

Major highways
  North Dakota Highway 8
  North Dakota Highway 21
  North Dakota Highway 22

Adjacent counties

 Stark County (north)
 Grant County (east)
 Adams County (south)
 Slope County (west)

Lakes
 Dry Lake
 Jung Lake
 Larson Lake

Demographics

2000 census
As of the 2000 census, there were 2,715 people, 1,152 households, and 778 families in the county. The population density was 2.4 people per square mile (0.9/km2). There were 1,419 housing units at an average density of 1.3 per square mile (0.5/km2). The racial makeup of the county was 98.93% White, 0.15% Black or African American, 0.37% Native American, 0.07% Asian, 0.07% Pacific Islander, 0.04% from other races, and 0.37% from two or more races. Hispanic or Latino of any race comprised 0.22% of the population. People of German ancestry were 68.7% of the population and people of Norwegian ancestry were 11.1%.

There were 1,152 households, out of which 26.4% had children under the age of 18 living with them, 61.2% were married couples living together, 3.8% had a female householder with no husband present, and 32.4% were non-families. 31.2% of all households were made up of individuals, and 18.2% had someone living alone who was 65 years of age or older.  The average household size was 2.30 and the average family size was 2.89.

The county population contained 23.4% under the age of 18, 3.9% from 18 to 24, 20.7% from 25 to 44, 27.0% from 45 to 64, and 25.2% who were 65 years of age or older. The median age was 46 years. For every 100 females there were 100.2 males. For every 100 females age 18 and over, there were 100.1 males.

The median income for a household in the county was $29,209, and the median income for a family was $34,668. Males had a median income of $23,201 versus $16,917 for females. The per capita income for the county was $15,555.  About 12.1% of families and 14.8% of the population were below the poverty line, including 21.2% of those under age 18 and 12.0% of those age 65 or over.

2010 census
As of the 2010 census, there were 2,477 people, 1,056 households, and 682 families in the county. The racial makeup of the county was 96.2% white, 2.1% American Indian, 0.2% black or African American, 0.1% Pacific islander, 0.0% from other races, and 1.3% from two or more races. Those of Hispanic or Latino origin made up 0.5% of the population. In terms of ancestry, 71.1% were German, 15.8% were Norwegian, 6.1% were Russian, 5.9% were Czech, 5.4% were Irish, 5.3% were Hungarian, and 3.2% were American.

Of the 1,056 households, 22.4% had children under the age of 18 living with them, 57.6% were married couples living together, 4.5% had a female householder with no husband present, 35.4% were non-families, and 33.1% of all households were made up of individuals. The average household size was 2.19 and the average family size was 2.75. The median age was 49.4 years.

The median income for a household in the county was $38,393 and the median income for a family was $49,605. Males had a median income of $33,155 versus $26,549 for females. The per capita income for the county was $24,928. About 8.2% of families and 11.0% of the population were below the poverty line, including 9.3% of those under age 18 and 13.1% of those age 65 or over.

Communities

Cities
 Mott (county seat)
 New England
 Regent

Unincorporated community
 Bentley
 Burt

Townships

 Acme
 Ashby
 Baer
 Beery
 Black Butte
 Brittian
 Campbell
 Cannon Ball
 Castle Rock
 Chilton
 Clark
 Farina
 Havelock
 Highland
 Kennedy
 Kern
 Kunze
 Madison
 Merrill
 Mott
 New England
 Odessa
 Rifle
 St. Croix
 Solon
 Steiner
 Strehlow
 Tepee Butte
 Wagendorf
 Walker

Defunct townships
 Alden
 Indian Creek Township

Politics
Hettinger County voters have traditionally voted Republican. In only one national election since 1936 has the county selected the Democratic Party candidate.

See also
 National Register of Historic Places listings in Hettinger County, North Dakota

Gallery

References

External links
 Hettinger County, North Dakota
 50th anniversary, Hettinger County, North Dakota :a tribute to our pioneers : 50 years of progress (1957) from the Digital Horizons website
 Hettinger County map, North Dakota DOT

 
1907 establishments in North Dakota
Populated places established in 1907
1883 establishments in Dakota Territory
1896 disestablishments in North Dakota
Populated places established in 1883
Populated places disestablished in 1896